Deuerling is a municipality in the district of Regensburg in Bavaria in Germany.

History 

On 24 April 1945, Lieutenant Colonel David H. Arp from Major General Stanley Eric Reinhart's Headquarters Staff searched for a location to set up the Division Command Post from which the assault crossing of the Danube River can be properly supervised and coordinated. He chose Deuerling. The crossing was accomplished in record time.

Weather 

The average high temperature in Deuerling is 63 degrees Fahrenheit and the average low temperature is 45 degrees Fahrenheit.

References

Regensburg (district)